Dendropsophus parviceps (common name: Sarayacu treefrog) is a species of frog in the family Hylidae.
It is found in the Amazon Basin of Bolivia, Brazil, Colombia, Ecuador, Peru, and Venezuela.
Dendropsophus parviceps is a locally common species with no known threats. These frogs are found on the leaves and branches in primary and secondary tropical rainforest, but also in open spaces close to forests. It is found in moist habitats (swamps, temporary watercourses, permanent ponds). It breeds in temporary bodies of water. Eggs are laid in water where the tadpoles develop.

References

External links
 Pictures of Dendropsophus parviceps.

parviceps
Amphibians of Bolivia
Amphibians of Brazil
Amphibians of Colombia
Amphibians of Ecuador
Amphibians of Peru
Amphibians of Venezuela
Amphibians described in 1882
Taxa named by George Albert Boulenger
Taxonomy articles created by Polbot